Leptomorphus is a genus of fungus gnats in the family Mycetophilidae. There are about 8 described species in Leptomorphus.

Species
L. africanus Matile, 1977
L. aliciae Matile, 1977
L. alienus Papp & Sevcik, 2011
L. ascutellatus Papp & Sevcik, 2011
L. baramensis Papp & Sevcik, 2011
L. bifasciatus (Say, 1824)
L. carnevalei Matile, 1977
L. couturieri Matile, 1997
L. crosskeyi Matile, 1997
L. elegans Matile, 1997
L. gracilis Matile, 1977
L. grjebinei Matile, 1977
L. gunungmuluensis Papp & Sevcik, 2011
L. gurneyi Shaw, 1947
L. hyalinus Coquillett, 1901
L. lepidus Matile, 1997
L. longipes Papp & Sevcik, 2011
L. magnificus (Johannsen, 1910)
L. matilei Papp & Sevcik, 2011
L. medleri Matile, 1977
L. nebulosus (Walker, 1848)
L. papua Papp & Sevcik, 2011
L. subcaeruleus (Coquillett, 1901)
L. utarensis Papp & Sevcik, 2011
L. walkeri Curtis, 1831
L. ypsilon Johannsen, 1912

References

Further reading

External links

 Diptera.info
 NCBI Taxonomy Browser, Leptomorphus

Mycetophilidae
Sciaroidea genera